Wild cherry is a common name for species of cherries growing outside of cultivation, especially:
Prunus avium, commonly known as "wild cherry" in the British Isles
Prunus serotina, commonly known as "wild cherry" in North America
Prunus cerasus, also called "sour cherry" or "tart cherry"

Wild cherry or Wild Cherry may also refer to:

Other plants
 Antidesma bunius, native to Southeast Asia and northern Australia
 Exocarpos cupressiformis, native to southeastern Australia

Places
 Wild Cherry, Arkansas, a community in the United States

Entertainment
Wild Cherry (band), an American rock band
Wild Cherry (album), self-titled album
Wild Cherry (film) (2009), American film directed by Dana Lustig